Thomas Kenneth Heintzelman (born November 3, 1946) is an American former professional baseball player. An infielder, he played in 90 Major League games over parts of four seasons with the St. Louis Cardinals and San Francisco Giants.

Heintzelman was drafted by the Cardinals in the seventh round of the 1968 Major League Baseball Draft and made his major league debut during the  season. Following the  baseball season,  he was traded to the Giants for Jim Willoughby.

Heintzelman's father, Ken Heintzelman, had a 13-season MLB career as a pitcher.

Tom Heintzelman served during the Vietnam War making him one of fifty-four former Major League baseball players who are also veterans of the Vietnam War.

Tom has three children and currently resides in Phoenix, Arizona. His children are Jennifer Doroty, Lora Heintzelman, and Brian Heintzelman.

See also
List of second-generation Major League Baseball players

External links

1946 births
Living people
Arkansas Travelers players
Baseball players from Missouri
Cedar Rapids Cardinals players
Gulf Coast Cardinals players
Florida Instructional League Cardinals players
Parsons Wildcats baseball players
People from St. Charles, Missouri
Major League Baseball infielders
Phoenix Giants players
San Francisco Giants players
St. Louis Cardinals players
Tigres de Aragua players
American expatriate baseball players in Venezuela
Tulsa Oilers (baseball) players